Reason, also known as ReasonML, is a syntax extension and toolchain for OCaml created by Jordan Walke, who also created React, at Facebook. Reason offers a syntax familiar to JavaScript programmers, and compiles to native code using OCaml's compiler toolchain. Reason code may also be compiled to JavaScript using the ReScript compiler.

The Reason community officially provides ReasonReact as a solution for React-based web applications.

BuckleScript and ReScript 

Reason was originally compiled to JavaScript using the BuckleScript compiler, which was created at Bloomberg L.P.

In 2020, BuckleScript was rebranded to ReScript, essentially creating a separate language that had different syntax from Reason and only compiled to JavaScript.

The ReScript compiler continues to support Reason syntax, and the two languages share that part of the toolchain.

See also 

 Elm: a functional language that uses an abstraction called ports to communicate with JavaScript
 PureScript: a strongly-typed, purely-functional programming language that compiles to JavaScript
 ReScript: a functional programming language that compiles to JavaScript and shares part of the Reason/OCaml toolchain

References

External links 

 Official website
 ReasonReact
 

Cross-platform free software
Extensible syntax programming languages
Free compilers and interpreters
Functional languages
ML programming language family
Object-oriented programming languages
OCaml programming language family
Pattern matching programming languages
Statically typed programming languages
Programming languages created in 2016
High-level programming languages
Software using the MIT license